Natalja Germanovna Karamyševa (also romanized as Natalia Karamysheva) is a former Soviet ice dancer who works as a coach and choreographer. With her husband Rostislav Sinicyn (Sinitsyn), she is the 1978 and 1980 Soviet national champion.

Career 
Natalia Karamysheva and Rostislav Sinitsyn placed 5th at the 1979 European Championships and 7th at the 1980 World Championships. They won the silver medal at the 1981 Winter Universiade.

Following her retirement from competitive skating, Karamyševa became a coach and choreographer working in the Czech Republic. Her current and former students and clients include Karolína Procházková / Michal Češka, Jana Čejková / Alexandr Sinicyn, Kamila Hájková / David Vincour, Lucie Myslivečková / Matěj Novák, Jakub Strobl, and Barbora Ulehlova.

Personal life 
Karamyševa is married to Rostislav Sinicyn. Their son, Alexandr Sinicyn (born 27 March 1996 in Prague), is a competitive ice dancer for the Czech Republic.

Karamyševa and Karamysheva have both been used to romanize her surname. Karamyševa is the Czech-style version.

Results
with Rostislav Sinicyn

References

1959 births
Living people
Soviet female ice dancers
Russian figure skating coaches
Figure skating choreographers
Sportspeople from Yekaterinburg
Female sports coaches
Universiade medalists in figure skating
Russian emigrants to the Czech Republic
Universiade silver medalists for the Soviet Union
Competitors at the 1981 Winter Universiade